Mistake Creek is a former rural locality in Isaac Region, Queensland, Australia.

On 17 May 2019, it was decided to discontinue the locality and absorb its land into the neighbouring localities of Clermont, Laglan, Frankfield and Peak Vale.

History 
The district takes its name from Mistake Creek, a tributary of the Belyando River, which was so named after Jerimiah Rolfe, an early local settler, believed his station to be on that river but later discovered it was on a tributary, which he named Mistake Creek.

Mistake Creek State School opened on 24 January 1983.

Education 
Mistake Creek State School is a government primary (Prep-6) school for boys and girls at 6652 Alpha Road. In 2017, the school had an enrolment of 14 students with  2 teachers and 2 non-teaching staff (1 full-time equivalent). Following the absorption of the locality of Mistake Creek into neighbouring localities in May 2019, the school is now within the locality of Clermont.

Amenities 
There are other local organisations including Mistake Creek Progress Association and the Mistake Creek Playgroup.

References

External links
  — map before Mistake Creek was discontinued
  — map after Mistake Creek was discontinued
  School's page giving its address using location "Mistake Creek" and showing location of school on map

Central Queensland